15 Lyncis is a binary star system in the northern constellation of Lynx. It is visible to the naked eye as a faint point of light with a combined apparent visual magnitude of 4.35. Based on the system's parallax, it is located 178 light-years (54.7 parsecs) away. The pair are moving away from the Earth with a heliocentric radial velocity of +2 km/s.

A telescope reveals it is formed by two yellowish stars of magnitudes 4.7 and 5.8 that are 0.9 arcseconds apart. The two stars orbit each other every 262 years and the orbital eccentricity is 0.74. The components are a magnitude 4.7 evolved giant star of spectral type G8III, and a magnitude 5.8 F-type main-sequence star of spectral type F8V. The former has exhausted the hydrogen at its core, causing it to expand to 8 times the Sun's radius. It is radiating 40 times the luminosity of the Sun from its enlarged photosphere at an effective temperature of 5,164 K.

References

G-type giants
F-type main-sequence stars
Binary stars
Lynx (constellation)
Durchmusterung objects
Lyncis, 15
050522
033449
2560